Julie Spicer England (born November 12, 1957) is an American chemical engineer and business executive, who served as Vice President of Texas Instruments Incorporated.

Born in Wisconsin Rapids, Wisconsin, England obtained her BA in Chemical Engineering in 1979 and later her MBA, both from the Texas Tech University. After her graduation she started her lifelong career at Texas Instruments Incorporated. In 1998 she was induced in the Women in Technology International Hall of Fame (WITI), and in 2004 was awarded the Henry Laurence Gantt Medal.

Selected publications 
 England, Julie Spicer, "Applications of Automated Test and Novel, Small Sample Size Statistics in FPA Production," for presentation to IRIS Specialty Group on IR Detectors, Aug. 13-16. IRIS Specialty Group on Infrared Detectors, Aug. 12-16. in: Texas Instruments Technical Journal. Volume 8. 1991. p. 148

References

External links 
 WITI - Women in Technology Hall of Fame - Julie Spicer England
 Julie Spicer England - Distinguished Engineer Citations at ttu.edu

 Julie England Art - Oil Painter

1957 births
Living people
21st-century American chemists
20th-century American businesspeople
20th-century American businesswomen
Texas Tech University alumni
People from Wisconsin Rapids, Wisconsin
Henry Laurence Gantt Medal recipients
21st-century American women